The Stigonemataceae are a family of cyanobacteria.

References

Nostocales
Cyanobacteria families